Neodymium acetate is an inorganic salt composed of a neodymium atom trication and three acetate groups as anions where neodymium exhibits the +3 oxidation state. It has a chemical formula of Nd(CH3COO)3 although it can be informally referred to as NdAc because Ac is an informal symbol for acetate. It commonly occurs as a light purple powder.

Physical properties
Neodymium acetate as a hydrate is a purple solid that is soluble in water. The solubility of the compound increases when sodium acetate is added, forming a blue complex. 
It forms crystalline hydrates in the composition of Nd(CH3COO)3·nH2O, where n = 1 and 4 are red-violet crystals that lose water at 110 °C. The crystalline hydrate with the composition of Nd(CH3COO)3·4H2O forms crystals of triclinic crystal system, with the space group of P 1 and the cell parameters of a = 0.9425 nm, b = 0.9932 nm, c = 1.065 nm, α = 88.09°, β = 115 .06°, γ = 123.69°. Most of the Nd3+ cations are coordinated by nine (or eight) oxygen atoms of the acetate ligands, which connect these polyhedra into slightly puckered sheets that are stacked in the [010] direction. The crystalline neodymium source is moderately soluble in water, methyl salicylate, benzyl chloride, benzyl alcohol and carbon disulfide.  In the temperature range of 320–430 °C, the anhydrate decomposes to form Nd2O2(CO3), which decomposes via a further intermediate stage at 880 °C to neodymium oxide.

Appearance
Neodymium acetate is a mauve-colored hygroscopic powdery solid. The resulting hydrate, like many other neodymium salts, has the interesting property that it appears different colors under fluorescent light.

Preparation
Neodymium acetate can be formed using neutralisation (acetic acid reacts with neodymium oxide, neodymium hydroxide or neodymium carbonate):

6CH3COOH + Nd2O3 → 2Nd(CH3COO)3 + 3H2O

3CH3COOH + Nd(OH)3 → Nd(CH3COO)3 + 3H2O

6CH3COOH + Nd2(CO3)3 → 2Nd(CH3COO)3 + 3H2O + 3CO2↑

It can also be formed in a reaction with a neodymium magnet and acetic acid:

20CH3COOH + Nd2Fe14B → 2Nd(CH3COO)3 + 7Fe(CH3COO)2 + 10H2 + B

The reaction of neodymium chloride and sodium acetate can also produce neodymium acetate:

NdCl3 + 3Na(CH3COO) → Nd(CH3COO)3 + 3NaCl

It can also be formed by reacting any neodymium salt with acetic acid. Anhydrous neodymium acetate can be obtained by direct oxidation of neodymium with malonic acid in a glass ampoule at 180°C. It is also possible to prepare the hydrate by dissolving neodymium(III) oxide in glacial acetic acid, alkalinizing it to a pH value of 4 with sodium hydroxide, and then slowly evaporating the solution. With different pH values, different hydrates can be obtained.

Uses
Neodymium acetate can be used for:
 Making ultra high purity compounds
 Making catalysts
 Making nanoscale materials
 A substitute for uranyl acetate in electron microscopy
 Preparing nanoparticles of neodymium(III) oxide.

It might also be used as:
 a skin-conditioner
 an antimicrobial
 a colorant.

Substitute for uranyl acetate
Uranyl acetate has been the standard contrasting agent in transmission electron microscopy (TEM) for decades. However, its use is increasingly hampered by regulations by governments due to its radioactive properties as well as its high toxicity. Therefore, alternatives are being searched for, including lanthanides or platinum blue as well as the use of less defined substances such as oolong tea extract. Despite these published alternatives, uranyl acetate is still the standard for EM contrasting.

In the periodic table the vertical ordering of elements in groups is based on the presence of the same number of electrons in their outermost shell, which determines their chemical and physical properties. Because neodymium (Nd) is right above uranium (U) the chemical properties of uranyl acetate and neodymium acetate would be very similar in binding to tissue in ultrathin sections thus leading to a similar amount of contrast.

Glass
Neodymium acetate can also used for glass, crystal and capacitors. It is useful in protective lenses for welding goggles. It is also used in cathode ray tube screens to increase the contrast between red and green tones. It is highly valued in glass making because of its attractive purple tint to glass.

References

External reading

Neodymium compounds
Acetates
Electron microscopy stains